Alcides Sakala Simões (born 23 December 1953) is an Angolan politician for UNITA and a member of the National Assembly of Angola.

Publications
 Memórias de um Guerrilheiro

References

Living people
Members of the National Assembly (Angola)
UNITA politicians
1953 births
Angolan writers